The Prior of Lesmahagow (later Commendator of Lesmahagow) was the head of the medieval Tironensian monastic community of Lesmahagow Priory, located in modern South Lanarkshire. The following is a list of priors and commendators:

List of priors

 Osbert, 1180
 Bricius, 1203
 Hugh de Liam, 1218 x 1220
 Waltheof (Waldeve), 1221 x 1226
 Thomas de Durham, x 1315
 John de Dalgarnock, 1348
 William, 1367–1369
 James Mador, 1468
 Richard Wylie, 1469–1470
 Alexander Wedall, 1477
 John Clasinwricht, 1477 x 1509
 N., x 1502
 Alexander Alani / Linton, 1502
 John Richardson, 1509

List of commendators

 James Cunningham, 1561–1580
 David Collace of Auchenforsyth, 1586

Notes

Bibliography
 Cowan, Ian B. & Easson, David E., Medieval Religious Houses: Scotland With an Appendix on the Houses in the Isle of Man, Second edition, (London, 1976), p. 69
 Watt, D. E. R. & Shead, N. F. (eds.), The Heads of Religious Houses in Scotland from the 12th to the 16th Centuries, The Scottish Records Society, New Series, Volume 24, (Edinburgh, 2001), pp. 134–6

Lesmahagow
Lesmahagow
People associated with South Lanarkshire
Lesmahagow